Ruth Elizabeth Watson (born 1962), is a New Zealand artist currently living in Auckland, New Zealand.

Education 
Watson received a BFA in painting from the University of Canterbury School of Fine Arts, in 1984, a MVA from Sydney College of the Arts at the University of Sydney in 1999 and a PhD from the Australian National University in 2005. She also has a Postgraduate Certificate in Antarctic Studies from the University of Canterbury in 2015.

Awards and honours 
 2018  Wellington Sculpture Trust, 4P6
 2014  Fulbright-Wallace Art Award
 2005  Walter W. Ristow Award for an emerging scholar in the history of cartography
 1994  Queen Elizabeth II Arts Council Visual Arts Fellowship
 1992  Oliver Spencer Bower Award

Residencies 
 2015  Headlands Centre for the Arts, Sausolito, California
 2009  Short term research fellowship, Newberry Library, Chicago
 2005  Asialink Australia Visual Arts Residency, New Delhi
 1992  Kunst-Werke Institute for Contemporary Art, Berlin

Exhibitions 
Watson has had numerous solo and group exhibitions in both New Zealand and Australia, with some exhibitions in Germany and the United States. She has worked in sculpture, photography, installation art and painting and began working with cartographic imagery while an undergraduate in the early 1980s. Issues concerning the representation of the world have been a main focus of her work since that time. Her work has been included in several exhibitions and publications relating to art and cartography. Group exhibitions include the 9th Sydney Biennale The Boundary Rider (1992), Cultural Safety, Frankfurter Kunstverein and Ludwig Forum Aachen (1995 / 1996), The World Over, Stedelijk Museum, Amsterdam (1996), Living Here Now: Art and Politics (1999), Paradise Now, Asia Society Museum, New York (2004), Better Places at the Perth Institute of Contemporary Art (2008), Unnerved: The New Zealand Project Queensland Art Gallery/Gallery of Modern Art, Brisbane (2010), SCAPE Biennale of Public Art (2011), grenzūberschreitend/across boundaries, Draiflessen Collection, Mettingen Germany (2018).

The same year, she collaborated with the ANU Research School of Astronomy and Astrophysics and created the largest map of the universe at that time. She joined the staff of Elam School of Fine Arts at the University of Auckland in 2006. In the summer of 2010-2011, Watson travelled to Antarctica as part of a science-based course run by Gateway Antarctica at the University of Canterbury. She subsequently produced artworks based on her experiences. She occasionally publishes writings on other artists' work.

Further reading 
 Nicole Roth, "grenzūberschreitend/across boundaries", Draiflessen Collection, Germany, 2018 
 Boswell, Rebecca, “Geophagy by Ruth Watson”, Art + Australia online
 Harmon, Katharine, "The Map As Art: Contemporary Artists Explore Cartography", New York: Princeton Architectural Press, 2009 
 Pound, Francis, "The Invention of New Zealand: Art & National Identity 1930-1970", AUP, 2009 
 Cosgrove, Denis, "Maps, mapping, modernity: Art and cartography in the twentieth century." Imago Mundi 57,1 2005. 
 Chiu, Melissa, "Tikis, Torches and Beachside Barbeques” in Paradise Now? Contemporary Art from the Pacific", 2004 
 Curnow, Wystan, "Mapping and the expanded field of contemporary art”, in Cosgrove, Denis (ed) “Mappings”, London: Reaktion Books, 1999

References

External links 

 Official Website

Living people
1962 births
Ilam School of Fine Arts alumni
Australian National University alumni